Gresten is a municipality in the district of Scheibbs in Lower Austria, Austria.

Population

References

Cities and towns in Scheibbs District